Krasnoturansky District is an administrative and municipal district (raion), one of the forty-three in Krasnoyarsk Krai, Russia. It is located in the southwest of the krai and borders with Novosyolovsky District in the north, Balakhtinsky District in the northeast, Idrinsky District in the east, Kuraginsky District in the southeast, Minusinsky District in the south, and with the Republic of Khakassia in the west. Its administrative center is the rural locality (a selo) of Krasnoturansk. Population:  17,322 (2002 Census);  The population of Krasnoturansk accounts for 37.2% of the district's total population.

Geography
The district is located on the right bank of the Yenisei River.

History
The district was founded on April 4, 1924.

Government
The Head of the District and the Chairman of the District Council is Mikhail I. Kapturov.

References

Notes

Sources

Districts of Krasnoyarsk Krai
States and territories established in 1924